= Labour Friends of Japan =

Labour Friends of Japan (LFJ) was an organisation of members of the UK Labour Party who are of Japanese origin or interested in Japan. It was an independent organization not affiliated with the Labour Party.

It was founded in 2015 and enjoyed support at parliamentary, devolved and local authority level. It was listed as an associated organisation of Chinese for Labour (which is affiliated to Labour).

As of 2021, East and South Asians for Labour (formerly Chinese for Labour) includes Japanese members and interests among its activities.
